Malsouqa (also malsouka - ) is a Tunisian dish composed of sheets of filo dough, stuffed with a savory filling. 

The Arabic name comes from لصق (lasaqa) meaning "to stick", referring to the cooking process of taking a ball of raw dough and sticking it to the heated pan to create the layered filo sheets. The name Malsouqa can refers to both the pastry and the dish.

In the Tunisian tradition, there are three main applications for the filo dough: the tagine, a cousin to the Italian frittata; the samsa, a parent to the Middle-Eastern samosa; the brik, a relative to the Turkish börek and the Greek tiropita (cheese pie); and the baklava,  a Syrian cognate brought by the Ottomans. It resembles the Spanish-Andalusian pastilla also served in Morocco. These utilisations are the legacies of various culture influencing the Tunisian identity.

The Tunisian tagine refers to the savory dish itself, unlike the Moroccan version which indicates the utensil into which a stew is prepared and served, akin to the English meat pie. The Tunisian one, filled with eggs, vegetable or meats, is often enjoyed cold as a finger food. 

The Tunisian samsa is a sweet delicacy, either rolled like a Chinese egg-roll or tri-folded like the Greek trigona panoramatos. The Tunisian version often includes toasted almonds, orange blossom water, sugar, cinnamon, honey and even pistachio.

The Tunisian brik is a large fried phyllo pocket filled with egg, parsley, harissa, and sometimes tuna. It is customarily cooked just enough to seal the pocket, while the egg remains over-easy. Although "brik" derives from "borek" etymologically through Ottoman influence, it does not resemble its Asia Minor cousin.

Finally, the baklava is served similarly as in other Eastern Mediterranean cultures of Greece, Lebanon, Jordan and Egypt for instance. A dessert composed with stacked phyllo dough sheets, a fragrant syrup, some honey and chopped nuts.

See also
 List of pastries
Mediterranean cuisine
Tunisia
Tunisian cuisine
Tunisian culture
History of Tunisia

References

Arab cuisine
Pastries